Alonzo Garcelon (May 6, 1813 – December 8, 1906) was the 36th governor of Maine, and a surgeon general of Maine during the American Civil War.

Early life and education
Garcelon was born in Lewiston (in modern-day Maine, then a part of Massachusetts), to French Huguenot parents. Garcelon attended Monmouth Academy, Waterville Academy, and New Castle Academy. Garcelon taught school during the winter terms to help pay for his tuition. In 1836 Garcelon graduated from Bowdoin College, and in 1839 he graduated from the Medical College of Ohio in Cincinnati, Ohio, and then returned to Lewiston to practice. Garcelon co-founded the Lewiston Journal in 1847. He served in the Maine House of Representatives from 1853–54, 1857–58, and in the Maine Senate from 1855-56. Garcelon donated to Bates College to Lewiston in 1855 and served as an instructor and trustee at the College. His son, Alonzo Marston Garcelon, graduated from Bates in 1872 and went on to serve as Mayor of Lewiston from 1883 to 1884. He was elected as a Delegate to the Republican National Convention in 1856. Garcelon's medical partner, Dr. Edward H. Hill, founded Central Maine Medical Center.

Civil War
During the Civil War, Garcelon served in the Union Army as a Maine surgeon general.  During the impeachment of Andrew Johnson after the War, Garcelon became disgusted with the Republican Party and their policy of "Radical Reconstruction" and became a Democrat. In 1871 he was elected mayor of Lewiston, and in 1879 he was elected Governor of Maine by the legislature, serving one term until 1880.

During his term as governor, Garcelon oversaw the "Greenback" controversy, when he investigated alleged voter fraud and determined that the Democrats and not the Republicans had won a majority in the legislature. Senator James Blaine came to Augusta with a hundred armed men to protest the results, and Garcelon called out the state militia. Civil war was narrowly averted, thanks to the peaceful intervention of militia leader Joshua Lawrence Chamberlain. In 1883 Garcelon's son was elected mayor of Lewiston.

Garcelon died in Medford, Massachusetts, and was buried at Riverside Cemetery in Lewiston, Maine.

Legacy and honors
Garcelon Field at Bates College is named after Dr. Garcelon, as is the Alonzo Garcelon Society, which provides scholarships to Bates for local students. In 2008 the Garcelon family announced the donation of a large collection of Garcelon family manuscripts to the Bates College Special Collections Library.

See also

 List of Bates College people
 List of governors of Maine

References

 "Bio of Alonzo A. Gercelon, M.D." Representative Men of Maine: A Collection of Biographical Sketches,(Portland, ME: The Lakeside Press, 1893). (link)

External links
 Greenback Controversy
 Garcelon bio
 Alonzo Garcelon Society

1813 births
1906 deaths
Bates College people
University and college founders
Governors of Maine
Maine state senators
Members of the Maine House of Representatives
Mayors of Lewiston, Maine
Union Army generals
Union Army surgeons
People of Maine in the American Civil War
Bowdoin College alumni
Bates College faculty
Maine Republicans
American people of French descent
Physicians from Maine
University of Cincinnati alumni
Democratic Party governors of Maine
Maine Democrats
19th-century American politicians
Maine Whigs
Maine Free Soilers